The Eastern Express Highway, abbreviated to EEH, is a  city express highway serving the cities of Mumbai and Thane. It is one of the busiest and most important roads in the Mumbai Metropolitan Area and is a part of the National Highway 48. It is a north–south artery of Mumbai connecting the city proper to the eastern suburbs and to the metropolitan area of Thane.
For most of its course, it is 6 lanes wide (3 lanes in each direction) with over a dozen flyovers/grade separators. 

The highway begins at Chhatrapati Shivaji Maharaj Terminus and stretches up to Thane. At Chembur it cuts off from the Sion Panvel Highway at the RCF Junction (Priyadarshini) to the outer limits of the city. It has heavy traffic during rush hours – southbound traffic in the morning rush hour; while northbound traffic during the evenings. It is used by an estimated 50,000 passenger cars daily. Towards south, beyond Sion it continues as Dr Ambedkar Road. Linking Sion in central Mumbai to Thane and beyond, the Eastern Express Highway is one of the several key roads widened and improved under the Mumbai Urban Infrastructure Project, by firms contracted by the Mumbai Metropolitan Region Development Authority (MMRDA).

Link roads connecting WEH and EEH such as the Jogeshwari–Vikhroli Link Road (JVLR) and Santa Cruz–Chembur Link Road (SCLR) are the major arterial roads of the Mumbai suburban road network. Both the WEH and the EEH run along north to south direction and are parallel in certain sections.

In 2009, The Brihanmumbai Electric Supply and Transport (BEST) decided to introduce more express buses on this highway. BEST has also introduced air-conditioned (AC) buses on this route. These buses use the flyovers on the highway, and thus attempt to reduce travel time.

See also

Western Express Highway

References 

 Urban Transportation-Government of India

Roads in Mumbai
Expressways in Maharashtra
Transport in Thane
Transport in Mumbai